Mesut Cemil (b. 1902 – d. October 31, 1963) was a Turkish composer, and a notable tanbur lute and cello player. His father was Tanburi Cemil Bey.

He participated in the 1932 Cairo Congress of Arab Music.

Cemil took cello and violin lessons and attended Berlin Music Academy as a student of cello. In 1927 he began to work at the Istanbul Radio. Cemil was assigned to most of the positions in the Radio, including announcer, producer and head of music broadcasts, as well as working as a tanbur performer. Cemil formed the Classical Choir at the Ankara Radio. He retired in 1960, but continued conducting choirs at the Istanbul Radio.

See also 
 List of composers of classical Turkish music

References

 Sources consulted 

 Endnotes

1902 births
1963 deaths
Turkish classical composers
Turkish tambur players
Composers of Ottoman classical music
Composers of Turkish makam music
Musicians of Ottoman classical music
Musicians of Turkish makam music
20th-century classical musicians
20th-century composers
Male classical composers
20th-century male musicians